Agrostis elliottiana is a species of grass known by the common name Elliott's bent grass.

Distribution
It is a bunchgrass native to various parts of North America in disjunct locations, including north-central California, southwestern and southeastern United States, and the Yucatán Peninsula in Mexico.

Description
Agrostis elliottiana grows in a variety of habitats, including disturbed areas such as roadsides. It is an annual grass growing up to about 45 centimeters tall. The leaves are short and thready. The inflorescence is an open array of wispy branches holding clusters of tiny spikelets, each just a few millimeters long but sporting a wavy awn which can reach a centimeter in length.

References

External links
Jepson Manual Treatment - Agrostis elliottiana
USDA Plants Profile
Agrostis elliottiana - Photo gallery

elliottiana
Bunchgrasses of North America
Grasses of Mexico
Native grasses of California
Grasses of the United States
Grasses of Alabama
Flora of the Sierra Nevada (United States)
Flora of the Southwestern United States
Flora of the Southeastern United States
Flora of Southeastern Mexico
Flora of Missouri